The 1937 California Golden Bears football team, nicknamed the "Thunder Team", was an American football team that represented the University of California (now known as the University of California, Berkeley) in the Pacific Coast Conference (PCC) during the 1937 college football season. In their third year under head coach Stub Allison, the Bears compiled a 10–0–1 record, shut out seven of eleven opponents, and outscored all opponents by a total of 214 to 33.

In the final AP Poll released on November 29, California was ranked No. 2 with 277 points, 50 points behind No. 1 Pittsburgh. After the final rankings were posted,  California shut out No. 4 Alabama in the 1938 Rose Bowl. The Associated Press did not conduct post-bowl polling at the time, but retroactive rankings by the Helms Athletic Foundation and the Dunkel System declared California as the 1937 national champion.

Three California players received first-team honors on the 1937 All-America college football team: fullback Sam Chapman; guard Vard Stockton; end Perry Schwartz; and center Bob Herwig.

Schedule

Awards and honors
Six California players received honors on the 1937 All-America college football team:
 Fullback Sam Chapman was a consensus first-team selection. 
 Guard Vard Stockton was a first-team selection by the United Press (UP), International News Service, Newspaper Enterprise Association (NEA), Central Press Association, and North American Newspaper Alliance.
 End Perry Schwartz was a first team selection by the All-America Board and the Walter Camp Football Foundation.
 Center Bob Herwig was a first team selection by Newsweek.
 Halfback Vic Bottari was a second-team selection by the NEA and a third-team selection by the UP.
 Back Johnny "Jelly Belly" Meek was a first-team selection by Collyer's Eye.

Nine were recognized by the Associated Press (AP), International News Service (INS), or UP on the 1937 All-Pacific Coast football team: quarterback Johnny Meek (AP-1, INS-1, UP-1); halfback Sam Chapman (AP-1, INS-1, UP-1); halfback Vic Bottari (AP-1, INS-1, UP-1); fullback D. Anderson (AP-2); end Perry Schwartz (AP-1, INS-1, UP-1); tackle Stoll (UP-2); guard Vard Stockton (AP-1, INS-1, UP-1); guard Evans (AP-2, UP-2); and center Bob Herwig (AP-1, INS-1, UP-1).

Three were also inducted into the College Football Hall of Fame: Herwig (inducted in 1964), Bottari (inducted in 1981), and Chapman (inducted in 1984).

1938 NFL Draft
The following players were claimed in the 1938 NFL Draft.

References

California
California Golden Bears football seasons
College football national champions
Pac-12 Conference football champion seasons
Rose Bowl champion seasons
College football undefeated seasons
California Golden Bears football